Obviously may refer to:

 Obviously (album) by Lake Street Drive, 2021
 "Obviously" (song) by McFly, 2004

See also
 Obvious (disambiguation)